4-Phenylthiosemicarbazide (4-PTSC) is a thiosemicarbazide used as an agricultural chemical and pesticide. It also possesses antibacterial properties attributed to electron delocalization in the thiosemicarbazide moiety.

References

External links
EPA - Pesticides Fact Sheets

Pesticides
Semicarbazides
Phenyl compounds